Edit Urban (born 27 March 1961) is a female former international table tennis player from Hungary.

Table tennis career
She won a bronze medal for Hungary at the 1987 World Table Tennis Championships in the Corbillon Cup (women's team event) with Csilla Bátorfi, Szilvia Káhn and Krisztina Nagy.

She also won seven European Table Tennis Championships medals, four of which were gold, and competed in the women's singles event at the 1988 Summer Olympics.

See also
 List of World Table Tennis Championships medalists

References

1961 births
Living people
Hungarian female table tennis players
World Table Tennis Championships medalists
Olympic table tennis players of Hungary
Table tennis players at the 1988 Summer Olympics
Table tennis players from Budapest